Beger is a surname. Notable people with the surname include:

 Albert Beger (born 1959), Israeli saxophonist 
 Bruno Beger (1911–2009), German racial anthropologist and ethnologist
 Dudley Beger (1929–1994), Australian rugby league footballer
 Renata Beger (born 1958), Polish politician